The 2005–06 season was the 58th season in the existence of FC Steaua București and the club's 58th consecutive season in the top flight of Romanian football. In addition to the domestic league, Steaua București participated in this season's edition of the Cupa României, the Supercupa României, the UEFA Champions League and the UEFA Cup.

Players

First-team squad

Squad at end of season

Transfers

In:
  Cornel Cernea - from Oțelul Galați
  Daniel Bălan - returned from the loan from FC Vaslui
  Andrei Enescu  - from Building Vânju Mare
  Victoraș Iacob - from Oțelul Galați
  Carlos Fernandes - from Boavista F.C.
  Vasilică Cristocea - from Farul Constanța

Out:
  Martin Tudor - to CFR Cluj
  Dorinel Munteanu - to CFR Cluj
  Vasil Khamutowski - to Tom Tomsk
  Tiberiu Curt - to Dinamo București

Competitions

Overall record

Supercupa României

Results

Divizia A

League table

Results summary

Results by round

Matches

Cupa României

Results

UEFA Champions League

Qualifying rounds

Second qualifying round

Third qualifying round

UEFA Cup

First round

Group stage

Results

Knockout phase

Round of 32

Round of 16

Quarter-finals

Semi-finals

References

FC Steaua București seasons
Steaua Bucuresti
Romanian football championship-winning seasons